The Phoenix Stakes is an American Thoroughbred horse race held annually at Keeneland Race Course in Lexington, Kentucky. Open to horses age three and older, it is contested on dirt over a distance of six furlongs and currently offers a purse of $350,000. Raced in early October, prior to 1989 it was run during the track's spring meeting. It became a Grade III event in 2000, then was upgraded to Grade II status in 2016.

Part of the Breeders' Cup Challenge series, the winner of the Phoenix Stakes automatically qualifies for the Breeders' Cup Sprint.

History
Founded in 1831 with the name from the local Phoenix Hotel, it is the oldest thoroughbred horse race in North America though it has not been run continuously. Hosted by the Kentucky Association racetrack in Lexington until 1930, the event was restarted at Keeneland Race Course in 1937. From 1943 to 1945, the race was renewed as part of the Keeneland-at-Churchill Downs meetings. Over the years it has been called the Brennan, Chiles, Phoenix, Association, Phoenix Hotel Stakes and Phoenix Handicap.

The Phoenix Stakes was raced on dirt until 2006 when Keeneland Race Course installed a synthetic Polytrack surface. In 2014, the Polytrack was replaced by a new dirt surface. As a result of these changes, Keeneland maintains separate sets of track records.

The 2016 Phoenix Stakes was the 164th running on the race. A. P. Indian won while establishing a track record for the new dirt surface.

Records
Speed record: (at current distance of 6 furlongs)
 1:07.60 - Anjiz (1993 on old dirt surface)
 1:08.43 - A. P. Indian (2016 on new dirt surface)
Most wins by a jockey:

 5 – Julio C. Espinoza (1972, 1973, 1980, 1981, 1982)

Most wins by a trainer:

 3 – D. Wayne Lukas (1991, 1994, 1998)

Most wins by an owner:

 2 – Robert E. Lehmann (1972, 1973)
 2 – Anthony L. Zuppardo (1980, 1981)
 2 – Overbrook Farm (1991, 1994)
 2 – Klaravich Stables (2012, 2013)

Winners since 1972

Earlier winners

 1971 - Great Mystery 
 1970 - Paderoso
 1969 - Lithiot 
 1968 - Miracle Hill
 1967 - Moccasin
 1966 - Bay Phantom
 1965 - Gallant Romeo
 1964 - Choker
 1963 - Editorialist (always race without a whip)
 1962 - Editorialist
 1961 - Eight Again
 1960 - Court Affair
 1959 - Bumpy Road
 1958 - Ezgo
 1957 - Bandit
 1956 - Sea O' Erin
 1955 - Sea O' Erin (raced for years)
 1954 - Pomace
 1953 - Pet Bully
 1952 - Hill Gail
 1951 - Mount Marcy
 1950 - Mount Marcy
 1949 - Miss Neal (Filly)
 1948 - Coaltown
 1947 - George Gains
 1946 - Sirius
 1945 - Best Effort
 1944 - Roman Sox (Filly)
 1943 - Miss Dogwood (Filly)
 1942 - Devil Diver
 1941 - Cherry Jam
 1940 - Easy Mon
 1939 - Torchy
 1938 - Main Man
 1937 - Preeminent
 1931 to 1936 - RACE NOT RUN
 1930 - Montanaro
 1928 - Luxembourg
 1927 - Percentage
 1926 - Marconi
 1925 - Almadel
 1924 - Chacolet (Filly)
 1923 - Minto II (Laverne Fator)
 1922 - Advocate
 1921 - General Haig
 1920 - Buford
 1919 - Opportunity
 1918 - Embroidery (Filly)
 1917 - Grover Hughes
 1913 - Flora Fina (Filly) (Champion Handicap Female)
 1912 - Mockler
 1911 - Countless
 1906 to 1910 - no race
 1905 - Agile
 1898 to 1904 - no race
 1897 - Goshen
 1896 - Prince Leif
 1895 - Halma
 1894 - Chant
 1893 - Clifford
 1892 - Wadsworth 
 1891 - Kingman
 1890 - Ban Chief 
 1889 - Once Again (3rd in the 1889 Kentucky Derby)
 1888 - The Chevalier
 1887 - Banburg
 1886 - Grimaldi
 1885 - Bersan
 1884 - Admiral
 1883 - Lord Raglan
 1882 - Freeland
 1881 - Sligo
 1880 - Fonso (won the 1880 Kentucky Derby)
 1879 - Falsetto
 1878 - Himyar
 1877 - Brademante (Filly)
 1876 - Vagrant (Champion 2-Year-Old Male & Champion 3-Year-Old Male)
 1875 - Ten Broeck
 1874 - Aaron Pennington
 1873 - Artist
 1872 -  (Filly)
 1871 - Molly Cad (Filly)
 1870 - Enquirer
 1868 - Crossland
 1867 - Phoenix Belle (Filly)
 1866 - Norway
 1865 - Gold Ring (Filly)
 1860 - Solferino
 1856 - Parachute (Filly)
 1855 - Balloon (Filly)
 1854 - Charlie Ball
 1853 - Lexington
 1852 - Star Davis
 1841 - Zenith
 1840 - Berthune
 1839 - Minstrel (Filly)
 1838 - Mary Brennan (Filly)
 1832 - Virginia (Filly)
 1831 - McDonough

Sire lines
 the Darley Arabian (1700c) sire line (all branched through the Eclipse (1764) line) produced 109 Stakes winners (71 colts/horses, 28 geldings, 10 fillies/mares), including all winners from 1989 to present. The main branches of this sire line are:
 the Mercury (1764) branch produced 1 winner, most recently Planetarium in 1872
 the King Fergus (1775) branch produced 16 winners. His sire line continued primarily through his son Hambletonian (1792) with 13 winners (exclusively through the Voltigeur (1847) line), continued primarily through his descendant Vedette (1854) with 12 winners, due primarily to his son Galopin (1872) with 9 winners (exclusively through the St. Simon (1881) line), most recently Whitmore in 2017
 the Potoooooooo (1773) branch produced 92 winners (all branched through the Waxy (1790) line). The primary branch of this sire line is through Whalebone (1807), which has produced 83 winners. In turn, the primary branch continues through Sir Hercules (1826), which has produced 61 winners, and then the Birdcatcher (1833) branch which produced 55 winners. From Birdcatcher, the branch of The Baron (1842) has produced 49 winners (exclusively through the Stockwell (1849) line). Birdcatcher's grandson Doncaster (1870) sired Bend Or (1877), whose sire line accounts for 44 winners. The main branch of the Bend Or sire line continued through his son Bona Vista (1889) with 37 winners, exclusively through the Phalaris (1913) line, which has dominated in the last several decades (including all winners from 2018 to present), primarily through his son Pharos (1920) with 24 winners (exclusively through the Nearco (1935) line), most recently Engage in 2019. Of special note, the secondary branch of Phalaris (1913), the less common Sickle (1924) branch (11 winners exclusively through the Raise a Native (1961) line, nearly exclusively through the Mr Prospector (1970) line with 10 winners), has produced all winners from 2020 to present, most recently Manny Wah in 2022.
 Special notes:
 The Whalebone (1807) branch produced two main lines: the primary branch of Sir Hercules (1826), and the secondary branch of Camel (1822) which produced 17 winners (exclusively through the Touchstone (1831) line). The Camel branch continued primarily through two of this grandsons: the Newminster (1848) branch (8 winners, primarily through the Hyperion (1930) line with 5 winners, most recently Delta Oil in 1975), and the Orlando (1841) branch (9 winners, primarily through the Commando (1900) line with 7 winners, most recently Honey Jay in 1973). A third branch through Waverley (exclusively through the Iago (1843) line) produced 5 winners, most recently Bumpy Road in 1959.
 The Sir Hercules (1826) branch produced two main lines: the primary branch of Birdcatcher (1833), and the secondary branch of Faugh-a-Ballagh (1841) which produced 6 winners (exclusively through the Leamington (1853) line), most recently 1894 Phoenix Stakes winner Chant.
 The Birdcatcher (1833) branch produced two main lines: the primary branch of The Baron (1870), and the secondary branch of Oxford (1857) which produced 6 winners (nearly exclusively through the Swynford (1907) line with 5 winners), most recently 1961 Phoenix Stakes winner Eight Again.
 The Bend Or (1877) branch produced two main lines: the primary branch of Bona Vista (1889), and the secondary branch of Ormonde (1883) which produced 6 winners (nearly exclusively through the Teddy (1913) line with 5 winners), most recently 1992 Phoenix Stakes winner British Banker.
 the Byerley Turk (1680c) sire line produced 25 winners (18 colts/horses, 2 geldings, 5 fillies/mares). The main branches of this sire (all branched through the Herod (1758) line) are:
 the Florizel (1768) branch produced 16 winners, (all branched through the Diomed (1777) line). The main branches of this sire line are:
the Duroc (1806) branch produced 2 winners (all branched through the American Eclipse (1814) line), most recently Zenith in 1841
the Sir Archy (1805) branch produced 14 winners. The main branches of this sire line include:
the Saxe Weimer (1822) branch produced 1 winner, most recently Virginia in 1832
the Virginian (1815) branch produced 1 winner, most recently Berthune in 1840
the Sir Charles (1816) branch produced 1 winner, most recently Charley Ball in 1854
the Bertrand (1820) branch produced 2 winners, most recently Mary Brennan in 1838
the Timoleon (1813) branch produced 9 winners (all branched through the Boston (1833) line), continued primarily through the Lexington (1850) line with 7 winners, including his win in the 1853 Phoenix Stakes, and 6 progeny winners, most recently Sligo in 1881
 the Woodpecker (1773) branch produced 9 winners (all branched through the Buzzard (1787) line). The main branches of this sire line are:
the Castrel (1801) branch produced 1 winner, most recently Kingman in 1891
the Selim (1802) branch produced 8 winners (all branched through the Sultan (1816) line). The main branches of this sire line are:
the Bay Middleton (1833) branch produced 3 winners (exclusively through the Tourbillon (1928) line), most recently Harry 'N Bill in 1985
the Glencoe (1831) branch produced 5 winners (nearly exclusively through the Vandal (1850) line with 4 winners), most recently Grover Hughes in 1917
 the Godolphin Arabian (1724c) sire line produced 6 winners (5 colts/horses, 1 filly/mare). The main branches of this sire (all branched through the West Australian (1850) line) are:
 the Solon (1861) branch produced 2 winners, most recently Marconi in 1926
 the Australian (1858) branch produced 4 winners, including:
 Phoenix Belle (1864), winner of the 1867 Phoenix Stakes
 the Spendthrift (1876) branch produced 3 winners, (all branched through the Intentionally (1956) line) most recently Carload in 1988

Phoenix Stakes winners with male-line descendants including other Phoenix Stakes winners
 Himyar (1878 winner) – 8 winners (6 colts/horses; 1 gelding; 1 filly/mare); most recently Honey Jay (1972; 1973)
 Lexington (1853 winner) – 6 winners (4 colts/horses; 2 fillies/mares); most recently Sligo (1881)
 Ten Broeck (1875 winner) – 2 colts/horses; most recently Bersan (1885)
 Enquirer (1870 winner) – 2 colts/horses; most recently Chant (1894)
 Gallant Romeo (1965 winner) – 2 winners (1 colt/horse; 1 gelding); most recently Momsfurrari (1989)
 Falsetto (1879 winner) – 1 colt/horse; Chant (1894)

Footnotes

References
 The 2007 Phoenix Stakes at the NTRA

Graded stakes races in the United States
Grade 2 stakes races in the United States
Open sprint category horse races
Breeders' Cup Challenge series
Recurring events established in 1831
Keeneland horse races
1831 establishments in Kentucky